Zhengzhou Huazhong Construction Machinery Co., Ltd is a manufacturer in China, which produces gantry crane, overhead crane and launching gantry. Song Facai is the chief founder and present general manager is Song Pengwei. It has a subsidiary company:Zhengzhou Huazhong Construction Machinery Installation Company for contracting all installation business

Name & Identification & Motto

Abbreviated English name ----- ZZHZ, originates from the initial four Chinese characters of “ZhengZhou HuaZhong”.

Motto“Believe Us, Believe Safety”. 
Pursue: to provide safe construction machinery.

History

1992.11.7

Established by Song Facai with registered capital 1 million in 1992. Concrete batching plants were the main products.

1999

In 1999, the company name was changed into ZZHZ.  From the year, it began to research, design and manufacture launching gantry for bridge construction.

2000

In 2000, honeycomb girder launching gantry was put into use for highway construction in Sanmenxia City, China. Patent for honeycomb girder was authorized by Patent Office of the People's Republic of China.

2006

In January 2006, 900t launching gantry for High-speed rail was used in Wuhan.

In March 2006, Chinese company name was changed from “郑州市华中建筑机械有限公司” to “郑州市华中建机有限公司”.

2009

Zhengzhou Huazhong Construction Machinery Installation Co., Ltd was founded with full registered capital, for the purpose of installation of construction machinery and bridge erection.

2014

Wet type Concrete spraying system was used for High-speed rail project from Xi'an to Chengdu.

Main Business

Supply and manufacture gantry crane, launching gantry, overhead crane, movable support system and wet type concrete spraying system, as well as contracting business of bridge construction.

Key Feature

First-made patent honeycomb girder steel structure

References

External links
 Launching gantry
Honerycomb girder launchinggantry

Companies based in Henan
Construction equipment manufacturers of China
Crane manufacturers
Chinese brands